Union Christian College, Meghalaya, established in 1952, is a general degree college situated in Shillong, Meghalaya. This college is affiliated with the North Eastern Hill University.

Departments

Science
Physics
Mathematics
Chemistry
Botany
Zoology
Nutrition

Arts and Commerce
English
History
Education
Economics
Philosophy
Geography
Political Science
Commerce

References

External links

Universities and colleges in Meghalaya
Colleges affiliated to North-Eastern Hill University
Educational institutions established in 1952
1952 establishments in Assam